Telecommunication Tower of US-Forces Heidelberg is an 80 metre tall telecommunication tower of the US Army in Europe on the mountain Königsstuhl, which is part of the City of Heidelberg at . The Telecommunication Tower of US-Army in Europe is one of the few military communication towers built of reinforced concrete and it was built in the late 1950s. It replaced 3 steel beam structures built in the late 1940s.
The Telecom Telecommunication Tower Heidelberg, the Fernsehturm Heidelberg (TV tower) and the Landessternwarte Heidelberg-Königstuhl (State owned Observatory) are all close by. The US Army Tower was used for microwave communications to other US Army sites all over southern Germany.

The installation was closed in July 2007 and the installation and lot returned to the state of Baden-Württemberg. It used to be run by the US Army 43rd Signal Battalion before it was closed down. Its future use is unknown.
It might be used for broadcasting several digital TV (DVB-T) transponders if the private German networks Pro7Sat1 and RTL Group make up their mind if they want to serve the Rhein-Neckar Region and its population of 2.4 million (the same applies to Stuttgart and its population of 3.6 million).

See also
List of towers

Communication towers in Germany
Buildings and structures in Heidelberg
1950s establishments in Germany
Towers completed in the 1950s